Each year, the jury of the Venice Film Festival is chaired by an internationally recognized personality of cinema.

From 1935 to 1939, senator and entrepreneur Giuseppe Volpi, founder of the Festival, held the office of President of the Jury. Volpi, together with journalist Mario Gromo holds the record of acting as Jury President for 5 times.

The first foreign President of the Jury was Scottish documentarian John Grierson. The first woman who held the office of President of the Jury was screenwriter Suso Cecchi d'Amico.

In 1992, two people held the office of President of the Jury together: actor Dennis Hopper and director Jiří Menzel.

From 1940 to 1942 the Festivals are considered as not disputed, while from 1943 to 1945 the Festival wasn't organized due to World War II. From 1969 to 1972 and in 1979 the Festival was not competitive, while from 1973 to 1978 the Festival was not organized.

Main competition jury presidents

Multiple time presidents

The following individuals served as President of the Jury two or more times:

See also
 List of Berlin International Film Festival jury presidents
 List of Cannes Film Festival jury presidents

Venice Film Festival